Aenos was a 1,935-gross register ton cargo ship that was built in 1944 as Rodenbek by Flensburger Schiffbau-Gesellschaft, Flensburg, Germany. In 1945, she was seized by the Allies at Flensburg, passed to the Ministry of War Transport (MoWT) and was renamed Empire Contyne. She was allocated to the United States in 1946 and sold into merchant service in 1948. In 1952, she was sold to Panama and renamed Aenos. In 1963, she was sold to Liberia and renamed Marlin, serving until 1965 when she foundered after her cargo shifted off North Carolina.

Description
The ship was built in 1944 by Flensburger Schiff-Gesellschaft, Flensburg.

The engine was built by Waggon-und Maschinenbau AG, Görlitz.

History
Rodenbek was built for Knohr & Burchard, Hamburg. She was seized in May 1945 at Flensburg, passed to the MoWT and renamed Empire Contyne. Her port of registry was changed to London. She was placed under the management of W A Souter & Co Ltd. The Code Letters GSNY and United Kingdom Official Number 180739 were allocated.

In 1946, Empire Contyne was allocated to the United States Maritime Commission. She was allocated to the reserve fleet on 23 October 1946. On 28 April 1948, she was sold to the Smith-Johnson Steamship Corporation, New York, for $65,733. Delivery was on 28 May 1948.

On 15 September 1951, Empire Contyne was sold to Compagnia Maritime Estrella, Panama and was renamed Aenos. She was operated under the management of P D Marchessini & Co.

In 1963, Aenos was sold to the Souther Star Shipping Co, Liberia and was renamed Marlin. She served until 18 October 1965 when her cargo shifted on a voyage from Tampa, Florida, United States to Port Williams, Nova Scotia, Canada. Of her 23 crew, 22 were rescued by the British motorship , and the other was rescued by a helicopter of the United States Coast Guard. The Coast Guard had despatched  to the assistance of Marlin on receiving her distress call, but it lost sight of her after nightfall.

References

1944 ships
Ships built in Flensburg
Steamships of Germany
World War II merchant ships of Germany
Ministry of War Transport ships
Empire ships
Steamships of the United Kingdom
Merchant ships of the United Kingdom
Steamships of the United States
Merchant ships of the United States
Steamships of Panama
Merchant ships of Panama
Steamships of Liberia
Merchant ships of Liberia
Maritime incidents in 1965
Shipwrecks of the Carolina coast